The Adult Film Association of America (AFAA) was the first American association of pornographic film producers. It fought against censorship laws, attempted to defend the industry against prosecution for obscenity, and held an annual adult film awards ceremony. Founded in 1969, it continued separate operation until 1992 when it merged with Free Speech Legal Defense Fund. The organization was also host to the Erotic Film Awards which were held from 1977 until 1986.

History

Origin, 1970s and 1980s 
It was founded in 1969 in Kansas City, with Sam Chernoff of Astro-Jemco Film Co. as the first president. Other notable presidents included film producer David F. Friedman, elected the third president in 1971, and re-elected four times before becoming Chairman of the Board, and erotic actress and magazine publisher Gloria Leonard, who became president in 1986.

It held adult film awards ceremonies for 10 years during the Golden Age of Porn. The first awards ceremony was held July 14, 1977, at the Wilshire Ebell Theatre in Los Angeles while religious protesters picketed outside, as they would several years thereafter. "These feverish protesters are such a familiar part of the ritual, they really should be listed in the program," sex news magazine Cheri stated after the 1983 awards.

With the advent of pornography on video, in early 1986 the AFAA renamed itself Adult Film and Video Association of America (AFVAA) and added a new award category, best adult video. The 10th annual awards, held at the Sheraton Premiere Hotel in Los Angeles on June 29, 1986, were the last.

The association changed its name again in 1987 to the Adult Video Association (AVA). No awards were given for 1987. Instead, in mid-1988 they were replaced by an annual Night of the Stars dinner-dance and legal fundraiser, the fifth of which it held in June 1992 with more than 500 people in attendance, the association's biggest show ever. Lifetime Achievement Awards were presented at the Night of the Stars, however, film awards were discontinued.

1990s 
By February 1992, the tables were turned – association members "picketed the Public Forum on Pornography sponsored by religious groups who hope to institute morality codes back into all movies made."

In October 1992, Video Vixens Trading Cards for collectors were released with part of the profits going to the AVA. That same month, the AVA and Free Speech Legal Defense Fund, which had been organized in 1991, unified to create a new umbrella organization, the Free Speech Coalition (FSC). Its role as the trade association of the adult entertainment industry was taken over by the FSC, which acknowledges the AFAA as its first ancestor.

AFAA award history
Pornographic actress Marilyn Chambers presented the very first award for best erotic motion picture to the L. Sultana production of The Opening of Misty Beethoven, while runner-up was Count the Ways, produced by Virginia Ann Perry. Jennifer Welles and Jamie Gillis were the first winners in the best actress and best actor categories. Pornographic actor John Holmes told the crowd at the first year's awards, "In the not-too-far distant future we will proudly say that we were pioneers."

Retroactive awards of merit were also given to five movies considered best from 1955 to 1975: Tonight for Sure, Not Tonight, Henry! Trader Hornee and Sometime Sweet Susan. Deep Throat was also honored as one of the top-grossing of all movies, including mainstream films, of 1972. Board chairman Friedman said the AFAA was "much too busy fighting legal battles" in the early days to hold awards ceremonies, so these special awards were intended to make up for not having presented them in the past.

For a time the most notable erotic film awards were those of the AFAA, considered to be "the closest thing the porn world's got to filmdom's Oscar derby." Many stars would arrive in chauffeur-driven limousines while some would vie for attention by arriving in a four-horse carriage, a Roman chariot, a horse or even an elephant. The third annual awards "drew a festive crowd of some 600 porn-people plus several hundred hard-core fans to the Hollywood Palladium." Subsequent awards shows even attracted celebrities such as The Godfather director Francis Ford Coppola, singer Stephen Bishop and gonzo journalist Hunter S. Thompson to be part of the audience and comedian Jackie Gayle and singer Jaye P. Morgan of The Gong Show to be part of evening's entertainment. The fifth and eighth awards ceremonies were videotaped and offered to cable and subscription television and for sale on VHS cassettes while the seventh was taped for an August 1983 broadcast on Playboy TV. Other awards during the porno chic era included Adam Film World's X-Caliber awards, first given out in 1975 and based on votes of fans, Hustler magazine's Erotic Movie Awards, first presented in 1977 and the Critics Adult Film Awards, bestowed by a New York-based group of East Coast adult sex film critics from 1981 to 1987.

By the third awards ceremony in 1980, although the concept was seen as positive, adult entertainment magazine Genesis reported they were "beginning to generate as much controversy as the regular Academy Awards, or more." While it seemed "politicking" gave the Best Film award to Legend of Lady Blue over heavy favorites Sex World and Take Off, the "most glaring lack of any validity" was shown by giving the best actor award to Aldo Ray. "The Erotica Awards are supposed to be presented to sex-film performers who both 'act' well and 'perform' well. In Sweet Savage, not only did Aldo Ray not 'act' particularly well—his part was simply gratuitous...he never even performed at all. The fact is he never even took his clothes off, nor did he show up to receive his award." Aside from that, Sweet Savage was released "well into 1979" and the films nominated were supposed to have been released in 1978, leaving the impression the AFAA gave him the award to "capitalize on his name and to obtain more media coverage." Adam Film World Guide, however, reported the following year's awards, which were presented in July 1981, "covered films released from mid-1980 to the middle of '81", which could have meant Sweet Savage was eligible for awards in 1979 if the same time frame was considered. Meanwhile, Adam Film World noted Ray's award "was not surprising considering that one of the announced functions of the aFAA and its annual awards is to upgrade the image of the adult film industry in the public eye."

Originally the Erotica Awards were determined by vote of the "association's membership of more than 700 producers, distributors and theater operators." However, in later years the AFAA ceremony was increasingly accused of bias, with a "belief among some that the West Coast producers were controlling what films received the awards" after Amanda By Night was passed over for best film at the 1981 awards. Starting with the awards presented in 1982, the AFAA decided to appoint an independent jury of three persons not associated with the adult film industry to make the final choices from the five finalists in each category. Jurors subsequently included an assortment of men and women such as a sexologist, author Robert Rimmer and journalists such as Brendan Gill of The New Yorker and other publications including Daily Variety, Playboy, USA Today and the Los Angeles Herald Examiner.

However, criticism continued, especially for the best erotic scene victory of Virginia in 1984, which led to the founding of the X-Rated Critics Organization and its Heart-On Awards. The role of adult film awards has been mostly supplanted by the AVN Awards, which also launched in 1984.

Credo 
The AFAA had a credo that "recognized the responsibilities of adult filmmakers to the general public":
1. That films of adult subject matter will be produced for and exhibited to adult audiences and that persons not of legal age will not be admitted.
2. That the definition of an "adult" is that designation set by the constituted authorities of the community but in no event any persons under the age of 18 years.
3. That we will produce and exhibit only films that are in conformity with the Free Speech Provisions of the Constitution of the United States of America.
4. That we will respect the privacy of the general public in our advertising and public displays.
5. That we in no manner will condone, produce or exhibit child pornography in any form.

Erotic Film Awards 

The AFAA awards were called the Erotic Film Awards and the trophy, known as the Erotica Award, was a golden statuette "in the form of a shapely nude holding high a rampant spear in an obvious attitude of erotic excitement." Winners are shown below in the year the awards were presented:

Best Picture

Best Adult Video

Best Actress 
{|class="wikitable"
|-
! style="background:#89CFF0"|Year
! style="background:#89CFF0"|Award
! style="background:#89CFF0"|Recipient
! style="background:#89CFF0"|Image
|-
| rowspan=2|1977
| Winner
|Jennifer Welles – Little Orphan Sammy
| rowspan=20|
|-
| style="background:#F2F2F2"| Nominees
| style="background:#F2F2F2"| Annette Haven
|-
| rowspan=2|1978
| Winner
|Georgina Spelvin – Desires Within Young Girls
|-
| style="background:#F2F2F2"| Nominees
| style="background:#F2F2F2"|
|-
| rowspan=2|1979
| Winner
|Desireé Cousteau – Pretty Peaches
|-
| style="background:#F2F2F2"| Nominees
| style="background:#F2F2F2"| Abigail Clayton, Carol Connors, Samantha Fox, Amber Hunt, Gloria Leonard, Sharon Mitchell, Tamara Morgan, Rhonda Jo Petty, Maurene Spring, Serena, Sharon Thorpe, Bambi Woods
|-
| rowspan=2|1980
| Winner
|Samantha Fox – Jack 'N' Jill
|-
| style="background:#F2F2F2"| Nominees
| style="background:#F2F2F2"| Lesllie Bovee – Misbehavin, Gloria Leonard – All About Gloria Leonard, Candida Royalle – Proball Cheerleaders, Serena – Ecstasy Girls, Georgina Spelvin – For Richer For Poorer
|-
| rowspan=2|1981| Winner
|Samantha Fox – This Lady Is A Tramp
|-
| style="background:#F2F2F2"| Nominees
| style="background:#F2F2F2"| 
|-
| rowspan=2|1982| Winner
|Georgina Spelvin – The Dancers
|-
| style="background:#F2F2F2"| Finalists
| style="background:#F2F2F2"| Chelsea Manchester – Nothing To Hide; Annette Haven – nominated twice, for Wicked Sensations & Skintight; Mai Lin – Oriental Hawaii
|-
| rowspan=2|1983| Winner
|Veronica Hart – Roommates
|-
| style="background:#F2F2F2"| Finalists
| style="background:#F2F2F2"| Samantha Fox – Undercovers; Kelly Nichols – Roommates; Loni Sanders – Never So Deep; Marlene Willoughby – Foxtrot
|-
| rowspan=2|1984| Winner
|Kelly Nichols – In Love
|-
| style="background:#F2F2F2"| Finalists
| style="background:#F2F2F2"| Arlene Manhattan – Aphrodesia's Diary; Jessie St. James – Between Lovers; Georgina Spelvin – The Devil in Miss Jones Part II; Veronica Hart – Little Girls Lost; Shauna Grant – nominated twice, for Suzie Superstar & Virginia
|-
| rowspan=2|1985| Winner
|Rachel Ashley – Every Woman Has A Fantasy
|-
| style="background:#F2F2F2"| Finalists
| style="background:#F2F2F2"| Angel – L'amour; Lisa De Leeuw – Dixie Ray, Hollywood Star; Victoria Jackson – Firestorm; Kelly Nichols – Great Sexpectations
|-
| rowspan=2|1986| Winner
|Gloria Leonard – Taboo American Style (The Miniseries)
|-
| style="background:#F2F2F2"| Finalists
| style="background:#F2F2F2"| Tish Ambrose – Corporate Assets; Laurie Smith – Snake Eyes; Ginger Lynn – nominated twice, for The Grafenberg Spot & Trashy Lady
|}

 Best Actor 

 Best Supporting Actress 

 Best Supporting Actor 

 Best Director 

Best Screenplay
{|class="wikitable"
|-
! style="background:#89CFF0"|Year
! style="background:#89CFF0"|Award
! style="background:#89CFF0"|Recipient
|-
| rowspan=2|1977| Winner
|The Opening of Misty Beethoven – Henry Paris|-
| style="background:#F2F2F2"| Nominees
| style="background:#F2F2F2"| Portrait of a Seduction
|-
| rowspan=2|1978| Winner
|Desires Within Young Girls – Edward E. Paramore III & Ramsey Karson|-
| style="background:#F2F2F2"| Nominees
| style="background:#F2F2F2"|
|-
| rowspan=2|1979| Winner
|Legend of Lady Blue  – A. Fabritzi|-
| style="background:#F2F2F2"| Nominees
| style="background:#F2F2F2"| Bad Penny, Dirty Lilly, Erotic Adventures of Candy, Girls of Pussycat Ranch, Hot Skin, Little Girls Blue, Little Orphan Dusty, Sweet Savage, Sex World, Take Off, The Health Spa
|-
| rowspan=2|1980| Winner
|The Ecstasy Girls – Bill Aaron & Ted Paramore|-
| style="background:#F2F2F2"| Nominees
| style="background:#F2F2F2"| Easy – Anthony Spinelli, Jack 'N' Jill – Billy S. Schaeffer, Misbehavin'  – B. Slobodian/C. Vincent, Proball Cheerleaders – Jess Pearson
|-
| rowspan=2|1981| Winner
|The Budding of Brie – Dorris Borrow & Henri Pachard|-
| style="background:#F2F2F2"| Nominees
| style="background:#F2F2F2"|
|-
| rowspan=2|1982| Winner
|The Dancers – Michael Ellis|-
| style="background:#F2F2F2"| Finalists
| style="background:#F2F2F2"| Neon Nights – Anne Randall; Games Women Play – Chick Vincent & Jimmy James; Nothing to Hide – Michael Ellis; Outlaw Ladies – Henry Pachard
|-
| rowspan=2|1983| Winner
|Roommates – Chuck Vincent & Rick Marx|-
| style="background:#F2F2F2"| Finalists
| style="background:#F2F2F2"| Body Talk – Avon Coe & Art Lester; Never So Deep – Paula & Gerard Damiano; Foxtrot – Anne Randall; Undercovers – Anne Rhine; I Like To Watch – Paul Vatelli
|-
| rowspan=2|1984| Winner
|In Love – Rick Marx & Chuck Vincent|-
| style="background:#F2F2F2"| Finalists
| style="background:#F2F2F2"| The Devil in Miss Jones Part II – Henri Pachard & Ellie Howard; Little Girls Lost – Ted Roter; Scoundrels – Anne Randall; That's Outrageous – F. J. Lincoln
|-
| rowspan=2|1985| Winner
|Dixie Ray, Hollywood Star – Dean Rogers|-
| style="background:#F2F2F2"| Finalists
| style="background:#F2F2F2"|
|-
| rowspan=2|1986| Winner
|Raw Talent – Joyce Snyder|-
| style="background:#F2F2F2"| Finalists
| style="background:#F2F2F2"| Snake Eyes – Anne Randall; Taboo American Style (The Miniseries) – Henri Pachard & Rick Marx; Corporate Assets – Thomas Paine; Trashy Lady – Steve Scott & Will Kelly
|}

 Best Erotic Scene 
{|class="wikitable"
|-
! style="background:#89CFF0"|Year
! style="background:#89CFF0"|Award
! style="background:#89CFF0"|Recipient
|-
| rowspan=2|1984| Winner
|Virginia – John Seeman, producer (the final scene with Paul Thomas & Shauna Grant was the one shown at the awards ceremony)
|-
| style="background:#F2F2F2"| Finalists
| style="background:#F2F2F2"| Aphrodesia's Diary – Serge Lincoln; Flesh and Laces, Part I and II – Hollywood International; Hot Dreams – Warren Evans; Reel People – Richard Frazzini; Sexcapades – David Stone; Suzie Superstar – Cal Vista International
|-
| rowspan=2|1985| Winner
|Firestorm – Cecil Howard (the "red scene" group grope with Victoria Jackson, George Payne, Sharon Kane & Michael Bruce)
|-
| style="background:#F2F2F2"| Finalists
| style="background:#F2F2F2"| Body Girls – Caribbean Films; Good Girl/Bad Girl; Stud Hunters – Suze Randall; Trinity Brown – Cal Vista International
|-
| rowspan=2|1986| Winners (tie)
|New Wave Hookers – Gregory Dark (the three-way scene with Ginger Lynn, Steve Powers & Tom Byron) and Passage Thru Pamela – Buncco, Inc. (the transsexual scene)
|-
| style="background:#F2F2F2"| Finalists
| style="background:#F2F2F2"| The Grafenberg Spot – Mitchell brothers; Snake Eyes – Cecil Howard; Too Good To Be True – Cottonwood Productions
|}

 Best Foreign Film 

 Best Musical Score 
{|class="wikitable"
|-
! style="background:#89CFF0"|Year
! style="background:#89CFF0"|Award
! style="background:#89CFF0"|Recipient
|-
| rowspan=2|1977| Winner
|Les félines – Vladimir Cosma|-
| style="background:#F2F2F2"| Nominees
| style="background:#F2F2F2"|
|-
| rowspan=2|1978| Winner
|Seven Into Snowy – Mayloo Music 
|-
| style="background:#F2F2F2"| Nominees
| style="background:#F2F2F2"|
|-
| rowspan=2|1979| Winner
|Sex World – Berry Lipman|-
| style="background:#F2F2F2"| Nominees
| style="background:#F2F2F2"| Candy Stripers, Deep Roots, Erotic Adventures of Candy, Legend of Lady Blue, Little Orphan Dusty, Sex Flicks, Sweet Savage, Take Off, The Health Spa
|-
| rowspan=2|1980| Winner
|The Ecstasy Girls – Ronni Romanovitch|-
| style="background:#F2F2F2"| Nominees
| style="background:#F2F2F2"| For Richer For Poorer – Gerard Damiano; Frat House – Sven Conrad; Libriana, Bitch of the Black Sea – Bob Freeman; Ms. Magnificent – Lon Jon; Telefantasy – Pacific Coast
|-
| rowspan=2|1981| Winner
|Amanda By Night – Ronny Romanovitch|-
| style="background:#F2F2F2"| Nominees
| style="background:#F2F2F2"|
|-
| rowspan=2|1982| Winner
|Rhinestone Cowgirls – Randy Rivera|-
| style="background:#F2F2F2"| Finalists
| style="background:#F2F2F2"| Outlaw Ladies – Jhana Productions; Nothing To Hide – Ronny Romanouvich; The Dancers – Chet Moore and Jim Moore; Beauty Pageant – Bob Lind; Bad Girls – Bill King
|-
| rowspan=2|1983| Winner
|Roommates – Jonathan Hannah|-
| style="background:#F2F2F2"| Finalists
| style="background:#F2F2F2"| Body Talk – David Henry; Irresistible – Geoffrey Pekofsky; The Mistress – Ronny Romanovitch; I Like To Watch – 3 Bells West
|-
| rowspan=2|1984| Winner
|Suzie Superstar – Horizon|-
| style="background:#F2F2F2"| Finalists
| style="background:#F2F2F2"| The Devil in Miss Jones Part II – Barry Levitt; Scoundrels – David Ogrin & Peter Lewis; That's Outrageous – Vern Carlson; Too Much Too Soon – Shamus Music
|-
| rowspan=2|1985| Winner
|Firestorm – Peter Lewis & David Ogrin|-
| style="background:#F2F2F2"| Finalists
| style="background:#F2F2F2"| All The Way In; L'amour – Daniel Boules; Stud Hunters – George Michaelski; Dixie Ray, Hollywood Star – Daryll Keen
|-
| rowspan=2|1986| Winner
|New Wave Hookers – The Plugz|-
| style="background:#F2F2F2"| Finalists
| style="background:#F2F2F2"| Hyapatia Lee's The Ribald Tales of Canterbury – Lexi Hunter; Squalor Motel – Slavin
|}

 Best Song 

 Best Art and Set Decoration 
{|class="wikitable"
|-
! style="background:#89CFF0"|Year
! style="background:#89CFF0"|Award
! style="background:#89CFF0"|Recipient
|-
| rowspan=2|1977| Winner
|Les félines – Andre Gillette|-
| style="background:#F2F2F2"| Nominees
| style="background:#F2F2F2"|
|-
| rowspan=2|1978| Winner
|Desires Within Young Girls – Brent Barrydown|-
| style="background:#F2F2F2"| Nominees
| style="background:#F2F2F2"|
|-
| rowspan=2|1979| Winner
|Sex World – Bill Wolf|-
| style="background:#F2F2F2"| Nominees
| style="background:#F2F2F2"| Candy Stripers, Captain Lust, Erotic Adventures of Candy, Health Spa, Legend of Lady Blue, Girls of Pussycat Ranch, Skin Flicks, Sweet Savage, Take Off
|-
| rowspan=2|1980| Winner
|The Ecstasy Girls – Valdesta|-
| style="background:#F2F2F2"| Nominees
| style="background:#F2F2F2"| All About Gloria Leonard – Howard A. Howard; Fantasy – P. Reisenwitz/G. Damiano; For Richer For Poorer – Gerard Damiano; Small Town Girls – Ektor Carranza
|-
| rowspan=2|1981| Winner
|Urban Cowgirls – Ektor Carranza|-
| style="background:#F2F2F2"| Nominees
| style="background:#F2F2F2"|
|-
| rowspan=2|1982| Winner
|Pandora's Mirror – Maria Ranoldi|-
| style="background:#F2F2F2"| Finalists
| style="background:#F2F2F2"| Outlaw Ladies – Eddie Heath; Games Women Play – Pat Finnegan; Bad Girls – Svetlana; Nothing To  Hide – B. C. Lewis & Marti Maxwell; Oriental Hawaii – Eddie Duncan
|-
| rowspan=2|1983| Winner
|Café Flesh – Paul Berthell/Steve Sayadian|-
| style="background:#F2F2F2"| Finalists
| style="background:#F2F2F2"| Body Talk – Avon Coe & Art Lester; Blonde Goddess – Bill Eagle; Casanova Part II – Maria Pia Tobalina; Foxtrot – Oslak Vabo & Anne Randall
|-
| rowspan=2|1984| Winner
|...In The Pink – Andre Nichipolodas|-
| style="background:#F2F2F2"| Finalists
| style="background:#F2F2F2"| The Devil in Miss Jones Part II – Eddie Heath; Scoundrels – Lynn Jefferies; Suzie Superstar – Robert McCallum; Virginia – Karen Fields
|-
| rowspan=2|1985| Winner
|Dixie Ray, Hollywood Star – Brian Costales|-
| style="background:#F2F2F2"| Finalists
| style="background:#F2F2F2"|
|-
| rowspan=2|1986| Winner
|Dames – Jules Burke|-
| style="background:#F2F2F2"| Finalists
| style="background:#F2F2F2"| Trashy Lady – Steve Scott; Hyapatia Lee's The Ribald Tales of Canterbury – Redi-Set; New Wave Hookers – Pez. D. Spenser; Squalor Motel – Michelle Seffman
|}

 Best Cinematography 
{|class="wikitable"
|-
! style="background:#89CFF0"|Year
! style="background:#89CFF0"|Award
! style="background:#89CFF0"|Recipient
|-
| rowspan=2|1977| Winner
|Femmes de Sade – Alex de Renzy|-
| style="background:#F2F2F2"| Nominees
| style="background:#F2F2F2"|
|-
| rowspan=2|1978| Winner
|Baby Face – Alex de Renzy|-
| style="background:#F2F2F2"| Nominees
| style="background:#F2F2F2"|
|-
| rowspan=2|1979| Winner
|Take Off – Joao Fernandez|-
| style="background:#F2F2F2"| Nominees
| style="background:#F2F2F2"| Captain Lust, Erotic Adventures of Candy, Hot Skin, Legend of Lady Blue, Little Girls Blue, Pretty Peaches, Sweet Savage, The Health Spa
|-
| rowspan=2|1980| Winner
|The Ecstasy Girls – Mike Stryker|-
| style="background:#F2F2F2"| Nominees
| style="background:#F2F2F2"| Fantasy – Harry Flecks, Jack 'N' Jill – Larry Revine, People – J. Fernandes/J. McCalmont, Proball Cheerleaders – Jack Genero
|-
| rowspan=2|1981| Winner
|Urban Cowgirls – Ken Gibb|-
| style="background:#F2F2F2"| Nominees
| style="background:#F2F2F2"|
|-
| rowspan=2|1982| Winners (tie)
|Games Women Play  – Larry Revene and Nothing To Hide – Jack Remy|-
| style="background:#F2F2F2"| Finalists
| style="background:#F2F2F2"| Skintight – Mike Stryker; Outlaw Ladies – Leroy Reoene; Bad Girls – Jean Petrov; Oriental Hawaii – Carlos Tobalina
|-
| rowspan=2|1983| Winner
|Foxtrot – Felix Daniels & Charles K. White|-
| style="background:#F2F2F2"| Finalists
| style="background:#F2F2F2"| Never So Deep – Harry Flex; Roommates – Larry Revene; Casanova Part II – Carlos Tobalina; I Like To Watch – Paul G. Vatelli
|-
| rowspan=2|1984| Winner
|Virginia – Rahn Vickery|-
| style="background:#F2F2F2"| Finalists
| style="background:#F2F2F2"| Aphrodesia's Diary – Gerard Loubeau; The Devil in Miss Jones Part II – Larry Revene; Flesh and Laces, Part I and II – Carlos Tobalina; Glitter – Roberta Findlay; Suzie Superstar – Robert McCallum
|-
| rowspan=2|1985| Winner
|Dixie Ray, Hollywood Star – Fred Andes|-
| style="background:#F2F2F2"| Finalists
| style="background:#F2F2F2"|
|-
| rowspan=2|1986| Winner
|Trashy Lady – Tom Howard|-
| style="background:#F2F2F2"| Finalists
| style="background:#F2F2F2"| Snake Eyes – Sven Nuvo; The Grafenberg Spot – Jon Fontana; Beverly Hills Exposed – Robert McCallum; New Wave Hookers – Jr. "Speedy" Bodden
|}

 Best Costume Design 
{|class="wikitable"
|-
! style="background:#89CFF0"|Year
! style="background:#89CFF0"|Award
! style="background:#89CFF0"|Recipient
|-
| rowspan=2|1977| Winner
|Femmes de Sade – Carol Maniscalco|-
| style="background:#F2F2F2"| Nominees
| style="background:#F2F2F2"| No other nominees
|-
| rowspan=2|1978| Winner
|Baby Face – Carol Maniscalo|-
| style="background:#F2F2F2"| Nominees
| style="background:#F2F2F2"|
|-
| rowspan=2|1979| Winner
|Take Off – Alexis Blassini|-
| style="background:#F2F2F2"| Nominees
| style="background:#F2F2F2"| Candy Stripers, Captain Lust, Erotic Adventures of Candy, Health Spa, Little Girls Blue, Pretty Peaches, Star Babe, Sweet Savage
|-
| rowspan=2|1980| Winner
|Chopstix, the Motion Picture – Foreign Delights|-
| style="background:#F2F2F2"| Nominees
| style="background:#F2F2F2"| Ecstasy Girls – Valdesta; Libriana, Bitch of the Black Sea – Pezda Vanutcka; Ms. Magnificent – Debbie Shine; Proball Cheerleaders – Marie Christie
|-
| rowspan=2|1981| Winner
|Urban Cowgirls – Cheree Eastmore|-
| style="background:#F2F2F2"| Nominees
| style="background:#F2F2F2"|
|-
| rowspan=2|1982| Winner
|Country Comfort – Sarah Yesko|-
| style="background:#F2F2F2"| Finalists
| style="background:#F2F2F2"| Games Women Play – Eddie Heath; Oriental Hawaii – Maria Pia Tobalina; Bad Girls – Cindy Matzker; Pandora's Mirror – Renata Ranoldi
|-
| rowspan=2|1983| Winner
|1001 Erotic Nights – Victoria Donne|-
| style="background:#F2F2F2"| Finalists
| style="background:#F2F2F2"| Café Flesh – Polly Ester; Blue Jeans – Fran Schifrin & Guiliana Schnitzler; Irresistible – Debbie Shine; Casanova Part II – Maria Pia Tobalina
|-
| rowspan=2|1984| Winner
|The Devil in Miss Jones Part II – Eddie Heath|-
| style="background:#F2F2F2"| Finalists
| style="background:#F2F2F2"| Between Lovers – Raynor Shine; Scoundrels – Lynn Jefferies; Suzie Superstar – Enjoy Costumes
|-
| rowspan=2|1985| Winner
|Sexorama – Dani Morrison|-
| style="background:#F2F2F2"| Finalists
| style="background:#F2F2F2"|
|-
| rowspan=2|1986| Winner
|Dames – Raynor Shine|-
| style="background:#F2F2F2"| Finalists
| style="background:#F2F2F2"| Bordello – Eddy Heath; Hyapatia Lee's The Ribald Tales of Canterbury – Sheri Eastmore; New Wave Hookers – Gregory Dark & John D. Arc; Trashy Lady – Arley
|}

 Best Editing 
{|class="wikitable"
|-
! style="background:#89CFF0"|Year
! style="background:#89CFF0"|Award
! style="background:#89CFF0"|Recipient
|-
| rowspan=2|1977| Winner
|The Opening of Misty Beethoven – Henry Paris|-
| style="background:#F2F2F2"| Nominees
| style="background:#F2F2F2"| 
|-
| rowspan=2|1978
| Winner
|Baby Face – Richard Chasen & Bill Westwick|-
| style="background:#F2F2F2"| Nominees
| style="background:#F2F2F2"|
|-
| rowspan=2|1979| Winner
|Legend of Lady Blue – Vilmos Vasquez|-
| style="background:#F2F2F2"| Nominees
| style="background:#F2F2F2"| Bad Penny, China Cat, Deep Roots, Erotic Adventures of Candy, Here Comes the Bride, Hot Skin, Little Girls Blue, Pretty Peaches, Sensual Encounters, Sex World, The Health Spa
|-
| rowspan=2|1980| Winner
|Jack 'N' Jill – Martha Ubell|-
| style="background:#F2F2F2"| Nominees
| style="background:#F2F2F2"| Chopstix – Mason Girard; Ecstasy Girls – Terrance O'Riely; Fantasy – P. Riesenwitz/G. Damiano; Misbehavin – Chuck Vincent; Proball Cheerleaders – Cine Enterprises
|-
| rowspan=2|1981| Winner
|Talk Dirty To Me – Tim McDonald|-
| style="background:#F2F2F2"| Nominees
| style="background:#F2F2F2"|
|-
| rowspan=2|1982| Winner
|Outlaw Ladies – Arlo Schiffin|-
| style="background:#F2F2F2"| Finalists
| style="background:#F2F2F2"| Nothing to Hide – Terrance O' Reilly; Games Women Play – James Macreading; Bad Girls – David I. Frazer; Skintight – Hayes Dupree
|-
| rowspan=2|1983| Winner
|Roommates – James Macreading|-
| style="background:#F2F2F2"| Finalists
| style="background:#F2F2F2"| Never So Deep – Paula & Gerard Damiano; Talk Dirty To Me II – Tim McDonald; The Mistress – Terrance O'Reilly; Café Flesh – Snowflake Films; Foxtrot – Oslak Vabo
|-
| rowspan=2|1984| Winners (tie)
|The Devil in Miss Jones Part II – Ted Ryan and Virginia – Farouk Ibenson & Skip Mason|-
| style="background:#F2F2F2"| Finalists
| style="background:#F2F2F2"| Flesh and Laces, Parts I and II – Rob Freeman & Alberto Soria; Glitter – Roberta Findlay; Too Much Too Soon – Snowflake Films
|-
| rowspan=2|1985| Winner
|Dixie Ray, Hollywood Star – Peter Stootsberry & Frank A. Coe|-
| style="background:#F2F2F2"| Finalists
| style="background:#F2F2F2"|
|-
| rowspan=2|1986| Winners (tie)
|Taboo American Style (The Miniseries) – Jim McReading and Snake Eyes – Oslak Vabo|-
| style="background:#F2F2F2"| Finalists
| style="background:#F2F2F2"| Trashy Lady – Steve Scott; Passion Pit – Michele M. Bale; The Adventures of Rick Quick – Kristin Leavenworth
|}

 Best Trailer 

 Best Advertising Campaign 

 Special Awards 
{|class="wikitable"
|-
! style="background:#89CFF0"|Year
! style="background:#89CFF0"|Award
! style="background:#89CFF0"|Recipient
! style="background:#89CFF0"|Image
|-
| rowspan=6|1977|Deep Throat Award
|Plymouth Films, producers of Deep Throat, for its box-office success
| rowspan=22|
|-
|Best Adult Film 1955-60
|Tonight for Sure – Francis Ford Coppola 
|-
|Best Adult Film 1961-65
|Not Tonight, Henry! – Ted Paramore beat Sinderella and the Golden Bra 
|-
|Best Adult Film 1966-70
|Trader Hornee – David F. Friedman beat Starlet (also by Friedman)
|-
|Best Adult Film 1971-75
|Sometime Sweet Susan beat The Devil in Miss Jones
|-
|Literary Man of the Year
|Prof. Arthur Knight, film critic, historian, and teacher at the University of Southern California film school
|-
| rowspan=3 style="background:#F2F2F2"|1978| style="background:#F2F2F2"|Man of the Year
| style="background:#F2F2F2"|Larry Flynt, publisher of Hustler, and Gene Reeves, the attorney who was with him when Flynt was shot on March 6, 1978, in Georgia.
|-
| style="background:#F2F2F2"|Literary Man of the Year
| style="background:#F2F2F2"|Al Goldstein|-
| style="background:#F2F2F2"|Best Media Man
| style="background:#F2F2F2"|Bruce Williamson of Playboy
|-
| 1979|Literary Man of the Year
|Dr. Wardell B. Pomeroy of the Institute for Sex Research
|-
|style="background:#F2F2F2"| 1980| style="background:#F2F2F2"|Media Man of the Year
| style="background:#F2F2F2"|Jim Harwood of Daily Variety
|-
| rowspan=5 |1981| Media Man of the Year
|David Shute|-
| Woman of the Year
|Virginia Ann Perry-Rhine, a past AFAA president
|-
| Man of the Year Award
|David F. Friedman, a past AFAA president and current board chairman
|-
| Pioneer Woman of the Year
|Ava Leighton|-
| Pioneer Man of the Year
|Dan Sonney|-
| style="background:#F2F2F2"|1982| style="background:#F2F2F2"|
| style="background:#F2F2F2"|
|-
| rowspan=2|1983|Pioneer Man of the Year Award
|Louis K. Sher|-
|Life Achievement Award
|Vincent Miranda|-
| style="background:#F2F2F2"| 1984| style="background:#F2F2F2"| Award of Merit
| style="background:#F2F2F2"| Dr. Lois Lee, founder of Children of the Night, on which Children of the Night was partially based on.
|-
| 1985|Pioneer of the Year Award
||Paul Mart'|-
|}

 Lifetime Achievement Awards 
After the Erotic Film Awards were discontinued, the association resumed presenting Lifetime Achievement Awards at its annual "Night of the Stars" fundraising event, starting in mid-1988. When the association merged into the Free Speech Coalition in late 1992, the new coalition took over the tradition.

Actresses
 1988: Nina Hartley
 1989: Sharon Kane
 1990: Kay Parker
 1991: Georgina Spelvin
 1992: Marilyn Chambers

Actors
 1988: Joey Silvera
 1989: John Leslie
 1990: Eric Edwards
 1991: Paul Thomas
 1992: Herschel Savage

Directors
 1988: Anthony Spinelli
 1989: Gerard Damiano
 1990: Alex de Renzy
 1991: Henri Pachard
 1992: Cecil Howard

Joel T. Warner 'Good Guy' Award
 1988: Mike Horner
 1989: Al Bloom
 1990: Hal Freeman
 1991: Mel Kamins & Bobby Lilly
 1992: Russ Hampshire

Hal Freeman 'Freedom Isn't Free' Award
 1989: Al Goldstein
 1990: Bob Guccione
 1991: Barry Freilich
 1992: Phil Harvey

Notes

 Adam Film World recorded the winner of this category in 1979 as having been a tie between Roger Caine and John Seeman. Cinema-X magazine recorded Roger Caine as the sole winner.

 This award was called "Best Foreign Language Film" at the 1977 and 1981 awards shows. It was not awarded after 1981.

 IMDb states this movie, while advertised as the first X-rated movie made in Russia, was actually made in the U.S.

 Adam Film World reported both Seven Into Snowy as winner of "Best Musical Score" and also Get Your Nose Out Of My Pantyhose won "Best Original Musical Score", a different award, in 1978. However, the AFAA's seventh and eighth annual programs, which list previous years' winners, make no mention of Get Your Nose Out of My Pantyhose or any separate "Original" score award. As well, IMDb states "Get Your Nose Out of My Pantyhose" is not a movie, but a song from a movie called Breaker Beauties, so Adam Film World's report of an "Original" score award may be erroneous.

 The official 8th Annual AFAA Erotic Film Awards program lists both songs as having won the award, however Jim Holliday's Only the Best book only mentions "With You" from Roommates as winning. Cheri magazine's coverage of the awards doesn't mention the category at all.

 This award was called "Best Production Values" at the 1979 and 1980 awards shows.

 Adam Film World' and Cinema Blue coverage of the first Erotica Awards both listed Not Tonight, Henry! as having won "Best Adult Film 1961-65" and Tonight For Sure as having won "Best Adult Film 1955-60". However, Not Tonight, Henry! premiered Dec. 30, 1960 in Los Angeles, while Tonight For Sure premiered in L.A., Oct. 25, 1962, so it's likely an error by the AFAA resulted in each film being given the award for the other's time period. Nominee Sinderella and the Golden Bra was listed in the correct time period. Jim Holliday's book, Only the Best'', lists the movies as having won in the correct time periods, however.

References
 IMDb: Adult Film Association of America Listing of film awards handed out by the association

Sex industry in the United States
American pornographic film awards
Adult industry awards
American pornography
Awards established in 1977
American film awards
1969 establishments in Missouri